HCLM can refer to
Hôpital Charles-LeMoyne, a hospital in Longueuil, Canada
Horse-chestnut leaf miner, a leaf-mining moth of the family Gracillariidae